KPWH-LP (103.5 FM, "The House") was a radio station licensed to serve Jonesboro, Arkansas. The station was owned by Powerhouse Ministries. It aired a Christian Contemporary music format.

The station was assigned the KPWH-LP call letters by the Federal Communications Commission (FCC) on February 12, 2004.

The station's license was cancelled by the FCC on June 2, 2020, for failure to file a license renewal application.

References

External links
KPWH-LP at MySpace
 

PWH-LP
PWH-LP
Contemporary Christian radio stations in the United States
Craighead County, Arkansas
Radio stations established in 2007
Radio stations disestablished in 2020
2007 establishments in Arkansas
2020 disestablishments in Arkansas
Defunct radio stations in the United States
PWH-LP
Defunct religious radio stations in the United States